Cedrinho is a Portuguese language common name for several plants and may refer to:

Cedrela fissilis, in the family Meliaceae
Erisma uncinatum, a tropical hardwood in the family Vochysiaceae
Guarea balansae, in the family Meliaceae
Picramnia parvifolia, in the family Picramniaceae

See also
:pt:Cedrinho